Avantgarde Music is an Italian record label, formed as a continuation of Obscure Plasma Records, focusing on black and doom metal artists. The label had a sub-label called Wounded Love Records, which has released albums by Dolorian and Taake. A new sub-label, Flowing Downward, had been founded in 2018, specializing in atmospheric black metal bands specifically.

Avantgarde Music's first release was the 1994 funeral doom classic Stream from the Heavens by Thergothon. The label has since signed many well-known black, death and doom metal bands such as Behemoth, Carpathian Forest, Mayhem and Unholy.

Bands

Abigor
Ad Hominem
Alternative 4
Ancient Wisdom
Ashbringer
Astarte
Azaghal
Beatrik
Behemoth
Carpathian Forest
Dark Sanctuary
Darkspace
Death SS
Den Saakaldte
Diabolical Masquerade
Dystopia Nå!
Dødheimsgard
Dolorian
Downfall of Nur
Drought
Dzö-nga
Enochian Crescent
Eternity
Evoken
Forgotten Tomb
Godkiller
Grey
Great Cold Emptiness
Katatonia
Kauan
Keep of Kalessin
Laburinthos
Lifelover
Mayhem
Mesarthim
Mortuary Drape
Mysticum
Necrodeath
Nehëmah
Nocternity
Nocturnal Depression
Nortt
Novembers Doom
Obtained Enslavement
Opera IX
Pan.Thy.Monium
Saor
Shade Empire
Shining
Sojourner
Solefald
Sordide
Taake
Thergothon
This Empty Flow
Throes of Dawn
Tormentor
Towards Darkness
Ulver
Unholy
Vials of Wrath
Windfaerer
Winds
Wode
Wolvencrown
Wyrd

References

 https://avantgardemusic.bandcamp.com/

External links
Official website
Avantgarde Music at Discogs

Italian record labels
Record labels established in 1994
Black metal record labels
Death metal record labels
Doom metal record labels
1994 establishments in Italy